Kittelbach may refer to:

Kittelbach (Düssel), a river of North Rhine-Westphalia, Germany, tributary of the Düssel
Kittelbach (Röllbach) a river of Hesse, Germany, tributary of the Röllbach